Thomas Melvin Jeter (born September 20, 1969 in Nacogdoches, Texas) is a former American football defensive tackle who played for five seasons in the National Football League. He played for the Philadelphia Eagles from 1992 to 1995 and for the Carolina Panthers in 1996. He was drafted by the Eagles in the third round of the 1992 NFL Draft. He played college football at Texas.

Professional career

Philadelphia Eagles
Jeter was drafted by the Philadelphia Eagles in the third round (75th overall) of the 1992 NFL Draft. He signed a three-year contract with the team on July 7, 1992.

References

1969 births
Living people
American football defensive tackles
Texas Longhorns football players
Philadelphia Eagles players
Carolina Panthers players